Global Cloud Xchange  (GCX) is a company which provides network services for enterprises, new media providers and telecoms carriers.  In September 2022, it was acquired by 3i Infrastructure for $512 million.

Overview
GCX has principal offices in London, Hong Kong, and Mumbai, and additional offices in Australia, China, Egypt, France, Germany, Italy, Japan, the Netherlands, Singapore, South Korea, Spain, Taiwan, the United Arab Emirates, the United Kingdom, and the United States.

GCX Limited was a subsidiary of RCOM, which is listed in India on the BSE Limited and the National Stock Exchange of India Limited and is one of India's largest telecommunications service companies providing wireless, wire line, long-distance, voice, data, video and Internet communications services. RCOM is part of the Reliance Group, one of India's largest business groups which has a significant presence in the telecommunications, financial services, and entertainment, energy and infrastructure sectors.

History
Global Cloud Xchange was formed as part of the rebranding of certain businesses of RGBV, which includes FLAG Telecom Group Limited ("FLAG"), Reliance Vanco Group Limited ("Vanco") and Yipes Holdings, Inc. ("Yipes").

In 2003, the Reliance Group was acquired and, in 2008, renamed FLAG as Reliance Globalcom Limited ("RGL"). RGL owns and operates various undersea and terrestrial fiber assets around the world, including the FEA cable system linking Europe to Asia via the Middle East and India. Before being acquired by Reliance Group, FLAG was listed on the NASDAQ National Market and London Stock Exchange. FLAG was first established in 1993 by a group of telecommunications companies led by Bell Atlantic.

In 2007, RGL acquired Yipes through one of RGL's wholly owned subsidiaries. Yipes is a US-based Ethernet Service provider which provides Ethernet and application delivery services for global enterprises. Established in 1999, Yipes has pioneered the Ethernet technology in metropolitan area networks.

In 2008, RGL acquired Vanco through one of its wholly owned subsidiaries. Vanco is a global Wide Area Network Operator. Vanco provides enterprise clients, directly or through partners, with optimized fully managed network solutions. Vanco was established in 1988 and its original parent company, Vanco plc, was listed on the London Stock Exchange before it was acquired by RGL.

In 2011, Reliance Globalcom set up world's first global Mediterranean gateway and hub in Europe set up with Hawk cable system.

In April 2013, Reliance Globalcom integrated Hawk cable system with Reliance Global Network. Later in December, it upgraded Trans-Atlantic cable with 100G technology.

In March 2014, RGL rebranded as Global Cloud Xchange (GCX) under the leadership of CEO, Bill Barney, to align with the company's strategic plan to deliver an integrated portfolio of infrastructure, data center and managed network services with cloud capabilities, especially across key emerging markets in Asia and the Middle East.

In March and June 2014, GCX announced plans for new subsea cables between Tokyo and California and between Mumbai and Singapore respectively, to bridge important gap and meet soaring bandwidth demands of new cloud-based applications and services.

In July 2014, GCX announced successful debut in the Global Capital Market by raising US$350M fixed rate notes maturing in 2019. The deal received an overwhelming response from the market, and was significantly oversubscribed.

In October and December 2014, GCX launched transformational Cloud X platform in Hong Kong and London. This new high performance enterprise-class platform delivers applications and content across the company's privately owned global fiber optic network.

In March 2015, Reliance Communications (RCOM), the parent company of GCX, expanded the role of Bill Barney, CEO of Global Cloud Xchange (GCX), to also oversee RCOM's Enterprise, IDC and National Long Distance (NLD) operations in India, while continuing as Chairman and CEO of GCX.

In 2015, GCX launched Cloud X Fusion, providing low latency connectivity across developed and emerging markets in the US, Europe, Middle East and Asia, which gives enterprises security, reliability and predictability.

In July 2015, Reliance Communications (RCOM) expanded its next generation content and cloud delivery network – part of its subsidiary Global Cloud Xchange – to five additional cities in Delhi, Mumbai, Chennai, Bangalore and Hyderabad as part of a wider strategy to support future growth in the country. These Cloud Xchange nodes can help government departments access 240 times the amount of compute power currently available in government data centers, and over six times the high speed storage currently available in India.

In August 2015, Reliance Communications' Global Cloud Xchange to expand Singapore-India connectivity, a major step forward to deliver next generation connectivity services to support the digital transformation and economic growth of India.

In February 2016, Global Cloud Xchange (GCX) announced the launch of Cloud X in Sydney, enabling customers across Australia to have on-net access to public Cloud platforms such as AWS, Microsoft Azure, Softlayer, Google, Rackspace, VMWare and more than 20 others worldwide, as well as software services like Microsoft Office 365 and Google Apps for Work.

In May 2016, Global Cloud Xchange was named Best Managed Services Provider at the Telecom Asia Awards held in conjunction with the annual Telco Strategies in Kuala Lumpur, Malaysia.

In April 2017, Global Cloud Xchange partnered with Alibaba group's Alibaba Cloud Express to drive new business opportunities in enterprise segment.

In June 2017, Global Cloud Xchange partnered with Aegis Data, vScaler. GCX enables direct access to vScaler's Cloud Services platform via GCX's CLOUD X Fusion, delivering Next Generation application-specific Cloud Services to consumers and enterprises over the GCX Global Network.

In June 2017, Global Cloud Xchange won two Datacloud Awards. "Excellence in Connectivity for Data Centers" and "Excellence in Cloud Services" at the Datacloud Europe 2017 conference.

Also in June 2017, Global Cloud Xchange partnered with Sovereign to offer global connectivity to business enterprise customers.

In September 2019, the company filed for bankruptcy protection in a US court when it failed to pay $350 million of 7% bonds that matured in the beginning of August, 2019.

In February 2020, Global Cloud Xchange renewed multi-year contract with Autoneum, to enhance Autoneum's Internet infrastructure with enhanced connectivity to 55 production locations across 25 countries in Europe, North and South America, Africa, and Asia

In March 2020, Global Cloud Xchange and Sparkle, announced the extension of their partnership by adding new spectrum capacity over the Flag Atlantic (FA-1) transatlantic system connecting Paris and London to New York.

Global Cloud Xchange Announces Majority Emergence from Bankruptcy

GCX announces the appointment of Carl Grivner to the Company’s Board of Directors

SGS Extends Network Connectivity Agreement with Managed SD-WAN from Global Cloud Xchange

GCX appoints new Chief Financial Officer, Anja Blumert

GCX announces an addition to the Company’s Board of Directors; Brian Fitzpatrick

Carl Grivner appointed Chief Executive Officer of GCX

GCX announces the appointment of Rahul N. Merchant to its board of directors

In May 2021, GCX announced key findings from a Pioneer Consulting report evaluating the service life of its global subsea asset. The evaluation concluded at least five more years on GCX’s oldest operating systems, plus longer life at increased capacity available for the foreseeable future.

In July 2021, GCX reported Free Cash Flow of $24.9 million, representing a $82.7 million improvement year-on-year, enabling the business to paydown nearly $10.5 million in debt. The combination of strong cash flow and deleveraging the business allows GCX to continue reinvesting toward future growth.

Global Network 
The principal elements of the Global Cloud Xchange Global Network include five subsea cable systems operating on major global data traffic routes: the Trans-Atlantic route, the Europe-Asia route, the Europe-Middle East and Egypt route and the Intra-Asia route.

As of 30 June 2014, these cable systems had a total length of 68,698 route kilometres ("rkm") and landed at 46 landing stations in 27 countries. GCX has launched India Cloud Xchange (ICX) through capacity acquired on the TIC cable to boost its connectivity between India and Singapore. 

GCX has owned as well as leased terrestrial networks with a total length of 83,432 rkm integrated within the subsea cable system. These are present in over 34 metropolitan areas across 14 countries covering major business centres. GCX also has a scalable global IP and multi-protocol label switching ("MPLS") network provided over 27 diverse owned and leased international subsea and terrestrial cable routes, with 836 direct inter-connections to 342 third party networks.

GCX's managed network services platform connects approximately 27,000 sites in 158 countries through a combination of leased and owned infrastructure offered through a dedicated secure IP network. Two GNOCs in Denver and Mumbai act as the global network operational centres of the GCX Global Network, the functions of which include 24-hour monitoring, network operations, restoration coordination and technical support.

Leadership 
Senior Leadership

 Carl Grivner: Chief Executive Officer
 Anja Blumert: Chief Financial Officer
 Jim Fagan: Chief Strategy and Revenue Officer 
 Jocelyn Cho: General Counsel
 Brad Kneller: Head of Submarine Operations 
 M U Khan: Head of Human Resources
Stefano Mazzitelli: President of Europe and USA 
 Vineet Verma: President of Middle East and Africa

References

External links
 Official website

Telecommunications companies of the United Kingdom
Telecommunications companies of the United States
Companies of Bermuda
Telecommunications companies established in 1988
Companies that filed for Chapter 11 bankruptcy in 2019
2022 mergers and acquisitions